Bounty is a coconut-filled, chocolate-enrobed candy bar manufactured by Mars, Incorporated, introduced in 1951 in the United Kingdom and Canada. It is a direct emulation of the Mounds bar introduced by Peter Paul in 1936, and also copies the milk chocolate enrobing of Hershey's Almond Joy, introduced in 1948. It is no longer being sold in the United States.

History

Bounty has a coconut filling, enrobed with milk chocolate (in a blue wrapper) or dark chocolate (in a red wrapper) and is usually sold as two small bars wrapped in one package.

Since 2006, a cherry-flavoured version has also been available in Australia. This was initially a limited edition flavour, but remained available as of 2013. In Europe, a limited edition mango flavour was available in 2004-05 and in Russia and Ukraine in 2010. A pineapple-flavoured edition was available in Russia during 2014.

Although Bounty is no longer distributed by Mars in the United States, similar products, such as Mounds and Almond Joy, are marketed by Hershey's.

On 3 November 2022, it was announced that Bounty bars would be removed from some Celebrations tubs in the United Kingdom, after the manufacturers found that 40% of people hated them. A limited run of "No Bounty" tubs would be available, in the weeks before Christmas. But a final decision had not been made after 18% of people named the Bounty as their favourite.

See also

List of chocolate bar brands

References

Chocolate bars
Mars confectionery brands
Foods containing coconut
Products introduced in 1951
British confectionery
Brand name confectionery